The 1997 Palmer Cup was held on July 10–12, 1997 at Bay Hill Club and Lodge in Orlando, Florida. The United States won 19 to 5.

Format
On Thursday, there were four matches of four-ball in the morning, followed by four foursomes matches in the afternoon. Eight singles matches were played on Friday, and eight more on Saturday.. In all, 24 matches were played.

Each of the 24 matches was worth one point in the larger team competition. If a match was all square after the 18th hole, each side earned half a point toward their team total. The team that accumulated at least 12½ points won the competition.

Teams
Eight college golfers from the United States and Great Britain and Ireland participated in the event.

Thursday's matches

Morning four-ball

Afternoon foursomes

Friday's singles matches

Saturday's singles matches

References

External links
Palmer Cup official site

Arnold Palmer Cup
Golf in Florida
Palmer Cup
Palmer Cup
Palmer Cup
Palmer Cup